The 2020 Texas Democratic presidential primary took place on March 3, 2020, as one of 15 contests scheduled on Super Tuesday in the Democratic Party primaries for the 2020 presidential election, following the South Carolina primary the weekend before. The Texas primary was an open primary, with the state awarding the second-largest amount of national convention delegates on Super Tuesday and third-largest amount overall: 260 delegates, of which 228 were pledged delegates allocated on the basis of the primary.

Prior to election day, senator Bernie Sanders had been ahead in Texas polling, even in spite of Joe Biden's powerful win in the South Carolina primary, and had hopes of establishing a commanding lead thanks to the high favorability Sanders had with the Latino electorate. With the support of several last-minute endorsements like those of Pete Buttigieg, Amy Klobuchar and Beto O'Rourke, in another "surprise win", former vice president Joe Biden topped the final results with 34.6% of the vote and 113 delegates, leading over Sanders (who got 99 delegates) by almost five points, and practically leveled his loss in California. Widely seen as a blow to Sanders, his failure to win Texas helped contribute to his depleting momentum and eventual loss of front-runner status after Super Tuesday. Former mayor Michael Bloomberg and senator Elizabeth Warren placed ahead in some counties and won several district delegates, but overall they missed the 15% threshold for statewide delegates.

Procedure
Texas was one of 14 states and one territory holding primaries on March 3, 2020, also known as "Super Tuesday". Voting took place throughout the state from 7:00 a.m. until 7:00 p.m. local time. In the primary, candidates had to meet a threshold of 15 percent at the state senatorial district or statewide level in order to be considered viable (Texas was the only state to chose districts from state senate elections over congressional districts for delegate distribution). The 228 pledged delegates to the 2020 Democratic National Convention were allocated proportionally on the basis of the results of the primary. Of these, between 3 and 10 were allocated to each of the state's 31 state senatorial districts and another 30 allocated to party leaders and elected officials (PLEO delegates), in addition to 49 at-large delegates. The Super Tuesday primary as part of Stage I on the primary timetable received no bonus delegates, in order to disperse the primaries between more different date clusters and keep too many states from hoarding on the first shared date or on a March date in general.

After precinct, county, and senatorial district conventions on March 21, 2020 during which delegates to the state convention were nominated, the state convention was subsequently held between June 18 and June 20, 2020 to vote on the 49 at-large and 30 pledged PLEO delegates for the Democratic National Convention. The delegation also included 32 unpledged PLEO delegates: 19 members of the Democratic National Committee and 13 representatives from Congress.

Candidates
Filing for the primary began in early November 2019. The following candidates filed and were on the ballot in Texas:

Running

 Joe Biden
 Michael Bloomberg
 Roque "Rocky" De La Fuente III
 Tulsi Gabbard
 Bernie Sanders
 Elizabeth Warren
 Robby Wells

Withdrawn

 Michael Bennet
 Cory Booker
 Pete Buttigieg
 Julian Castro
 John Delaney
 Amy Klobuchar
 Deval Patrick
 Tom Steyer
 Marianne Williamson
 Andrew Yang

Kamala Harris had been accepted onto the ballot, but had withdrawn early so that she was not put on it.

Polling

Results

Results by county

† - candidates who withdrew prior to early voting, but appeared on the ballot 
‡ - candidates who withdrew after early voting had started

The winner in each county is denoted by bold.

Analysis
Exit polls indicated Sanders winning an overwhelming share of the Latino vote, exemplifying his strong efforts at outreach to Texas's Latino community carrying with that almost every counties in the Mexican–American border as well as cities like El Paso, San Antonio and Austin. He also won the voters under 50 of all races. Biden's strength was overwhelmingly among older people, especially whites and African-Americans in cities such as Dallas and Houston.

See also
 2020 Texas Republican presidential primary

Notes
Additional candidates

General

Withdrawn candidates votes by county

Withdrawn candidates percentages by county

References

External links
The Green Papers delegate allocation summary
Texas Democratic Party delegate selection plan summary
FiveThirtyEight Texas primary poll tracker

Texas Democratic
Democratic primary
2020